Louisa Sança Silva Illaria da Conceição (born December 7, 1974) is a former Cape Verdean female basketball player.

External links
Profile at fiba.com

1974 births
Living people
Sportspeople from Praia
Cape Verdean women's basketball players